Benjamin John Parrillo is an American film and television actor, writer and director.

Early life and education
Parrillo was born in Boston. He is a graduate of Wesleyan University, where he majored in theater arts, American history, and Italian.

Career
As of 2007, Parrillo has written and produced two short films: Jolly Good Fellow in 2006 and A Moron, a Loser, and a Coffee Shop in 2007. He also directed and starred in both movies. Parrillo has written feature film scripts that are represented by Creative Artists Agency. In 2010, he wrote, directed, and starred in an original one-hour television series titled Bed of Nails.

As an actor, Parillo's more significant roles have been in shows such as MyNetworkTV's  Wicked Wicked Games. He has also been credited for guest appearances in episodes of Law & Order: Criminal Intent, Heartland, Desperate Housewives, CSI: NY, Bones, 24, NCIS, Judging Amy, Boston Legal, Cold Case, The Shield, The Division, Diagnosis: Murder, Charmed, Six Feet Under, NYPD Blue, The King of Queens, Leap of Faith, House M.D., Close to Home, and other television series.  Ben recently appeared in Kathryn Bigelow's Oscar-nominated film, Zero Dark Thirty.

Filmography

Film

Television

References

External links

 http://www.bedofnails.tv/

Year of birth missing (living people)
Living people
Wesleyan University alumni
American male film actors
American film directors
American male screenwriters
American male television actors